HVM may refer to:

 HVM Racing, an auto racing team
 Hardware virtual machine
 High Velocity Missile
 Hostile vehicle mitigation

See also
 High Value Manufacturing Catapult (HVM Catapult)